The March for the Equal Rights Amendment took place on July 9, 1978 in Washington, DC. Over 100,000 people marched for ratification of the Equal Rights Amendment.

Speakers
There were 35 notable speakers at the march organized by the National Organization for Women.

Attendees 
Many prominent women's rights activists participated in this march including Gloria Steinem, Pauli Murray and Betty Friedan.

Issues
The amendment proposed equal rights for women, and was first introduced to Congress in 1923, finally gaining Congressional approval in 1972. Once Congress had approved the amendment, ratification by the states was requested and the typical 7-year time limit for ratification by two-thirds of the states was set in motion. The march was held to convince legislators that the period allowed for ratification should be extended beyond the deadline, which would occur on 29 March 1979. Protesters were successful in getting the House to approve an extension to 1982 in August, 1978 and the Senate to grant approval of the same time frame by a vote of 60 to 36 in October 1978. It was the first time that a proposed amendment to the Constitution had ever had its ratification period extended.  Since 1982, extension of the ratification has been reintroduced in every legislative session.

Timeline
 March 22, 1972 - amendment passed in Congress
 1977 - amendment approved by 35 of 50 states
 1978 - not ratified, (3 states short)
 1982  - deadline for ratification. 15 states did not approve.
 1994 - 12 states did not approve ratification
 1995–2016, ERA bills were passed however not all of the bills passed both Senate and House
 2003 - House approved ratification, however Senate did not
 2014 - Senate approved, however House did not
 2017 - Nevada approved
 2018 - Illinois approved; Thirteen states had not yet approved

Outcome
The amendment still has not been ratified by all of the states to become a part of the Constitution of the United States.

See also
 List of protest marches on Washington, D.C.
 Women's rights

References

Women's rights in the United States
Protest marches in Washington, D.C.
1978 in Washington, D.C.
July 1978 events in the United States
1978 in women's history
1978 protests

Equal Rights Amendment